Sliedrecht is a railway station in Sliedrecht, Netherlands. The station is located on the MerwedeLingelijn line between Dordrecht and Geldermalsen, part of the Betuwelijn.

Train services

Bicycles are allowed on board for free.

Bus services

History 
It was opened on 16 July 1885, when the station had a single track. Next to the passenger lines is the Betuweroute freight railway line. Arriva operated the service since December 2006. However, Qbuzz took over services from Arriva on 9 December 2018. A new station building was built in 1985, which has already been demolished. In the older stationbuilding (photo) is a restaurant: "De Heren van Slydrecht" (The Lords of Sliedrecht).

On 27 November 1942, it was the scene of a collision between two trains around 18:30 local time. A slow train to Dordrecht was waiting at one of the platforms, and a second train from Leerdam collided at high speed with the rear carriages. The steam engine continued until it derailed further up the line and one of the trains involved caught fire.

References

External links
Qbuzz website 
Dutch Public Transport journey planner 

Railway stations in South Holland
Railway stations opened in 1885
Railway stations on the Merwede-Lingelijn
Sliedrecht